Eggon may refer to:
 Eggon language, a language of Nigeria
 Eggon people, an ethnic group mostly based in North Central Nigeria 
 Egon, Nigeria, also known as Nassarawa-Eggon, a Local Government Area in Nasarawa State, Nigeria, centred on the town of Eggon